Gudam Maharaniganj is a village in the Cooch Behar I CD block in the Cooch Behar Sadar subdivision of the Cooch Behar district in West Bengal, India

Geography

Location                                    

Area overview
The map alongside shows the north-central part of the district. It has the highest level of urbanisation in an overwhelming rural district. 22.08% of the population of the Cooch Behar Sadar subdivision lives in the urban areas and 77.92% lives in the rural areas. The entire district forms the flat alluvial flood plains of mighty rivers.

Note: The map alongside presents some of the notable locations in the subdivision. All places marked in the map are linked in the larger full screen map.

Demographics
As per the 2011 Census of India, Gudam Maharaniganj had a total population of 1,639.  There were 836 (51%) males and 803 (49%) females. There were 167 persons in the age range of 0 to 6 years. The total number of literate people in Gudam Maharaniganj was 1,137 (77.24% of the population over 6 years).

Culture
The mazar named Torsha Pirdham and a mosque here are famous.

A Pir used to be engaged in religious activities in the early years of the 18th century on the banks of the Torsha River near where the railway bridge now stands. He is said to have certain supernatural powers. It is said that Maharaja Harendra Narayan of the Cooch Behar State was an admirer of his but the Torsha Pir did not show any special respect for him. The Maharaja donated around 7 bighas of land for the upkeep of the place where the Torsha Pir lived. Attracted by him, many people converted to Islam. There now is a mazar at the place.

References 

Villages in Cooch Behar district